is the Japanese name for the star Altair, also known as  or  in Japanese. 

It may also refer to: 
 the cowherd celebrated in the Chinese star festival, Qi Xi
 the cowherd celebrated in the Japanese star festival, Tanabata influenced by Qi Xi
   trains operated on the Keihan Main Line in Osaka, Japan
 the chaser satellite of the Japanese Engineering Test Satellite ETS-VII, also known as KIKU-7

See also 
 Orihime (disambiguation), the Japanese name for the star Vega